The Ahwar of Southern Iraq: Refuge of Biodiversity and the Relict Landscape of the Mesopotamian Cities is a UNESCO World Heritage Site located in south Iraq.

The Ahwar currently consists of seven sites, including three cities of Sumerian origin and four wetland areas of the Mesopotamian Marshes:
 Huwaizah Marshes
 Central Marshes
 East Hammar Marshes
 West Hammar Marshes
 Uruk Archaeological City
 Ur Archaeological City
 Tell Eridu Archaeological Site

Notes

References

World Heritage Sites in Iraq